The Copa de la Liga Profesional (English: Professional League Cup; officially named "Copa Diego Armando Maradona" in its first edition) is an official Argentine football cup competition. The cup was planned and organised by the "Liga Profesional de Fútbol", a body linked to the Argentine Football Association (AFA) that replaced the defunct Superliga Argentina. This cup was conceived as a contingency competition after the schedule for a regular league season had been repeatedly delayed because of the COVID-19 pandemic.

After the death of Diego Maradona in November 2020, the competition was named after him. Nevertheless, the LPF executives decided to suppress the "Diego Maradona" name to keep distance from the conflict between Maradona's heirs and lawyer Matías Morla, owner of the brand and former representative of Maradona.

Boca Juniors was the first champion of the competition, after beating Banfield in the final.

Format 
The first edition was contested by the 24 teams that had taken part in the 2019–20 Primera División championship, drawn into six groups of four teams each, playing on a double round-robin basis. In each zone, the top two teams advanced to the "Fase Campeón" while the bottom two teams advanced to the "Fase Complementación".

In the Fase Campeón, the 12 qualified teams were split into two groups of six teams each, where they played a single round-robin tournament. The winners of each group played the final match at a neutral venue. The winner of the Fase Campeón final were crowned champion of the cup also qualifying for Copa Libertadores.

On the other hand, teams in Fase Complementación played under the same format as in the Fase Campeón. The winners of the Fase Complementación final played a match against the Fase Campeón runners-up with the winners qualifying for the Copa Sudamericana.

The second edition had a similar format with a total of 26 teams including two promoted from Primera Nacional. Teams were drawn into two groups of 13 teams each, playing on a single round-robin a total of 13 rounds.

List of champions

Titles by club

Top scorers

References

External links
 LPF official website

c
c
a